The Beni Ouragh or Aït Ouragh  (in Arabic : بني وراع, in Tamaziɣt : ⴰⵢⵜ ⵄⵔⴰⵖ, Ayt Uragh) are a Zenata Berber tribe of the Ouarsenis in Algeria, located precisely in the region of Ammi Moussa which rose on their territory to the place once called Khamis. The tribe consists of 23 âarch.

History 
The Beni-Ouragh tribe is a very old berbers tribe, it is made up of 23 âarch and is located to the east and south of Ammi Moussa. According to Ibn Khaldun, the tribe comes from the first ancient Berber ramifications, cousin of the Tuaregs, whose real name is that of Houara, eponymous ancestor of the latter and probably brother of Ouraghe "Yellow man" in the Berber. At the beginning of French colonization, the 23 âarch of the Beni-Ouragh made an energetic resistance to the French armies and took an active part in the revolt of 1864 put down by General Émile Mellinet.

Ernest Carette, engineer battalion commander, estimated their number in 1842 at 19,200 individuals. They are distributed today under different names in the daira of Ammi Moussa and other fractions administratively depend on several municipalities of territorial jurisdiction of three wilayas (Relizane - Tissemsilt - Tiaret).

List of 23 âarch of the tribe of Beni-Ouragh 
 Ammi-Moussa.
 Douar Touares
 Douar Ouled-Sabeur
 Douar Ouled-Izmeur
 Douar Ouled-Bou-Ikni
 Douar Ouled-Moudjeur
 Douar Ouled-Yaich
 Douar Ouled-Bouriah
 Douar Marioua
 Douar Ouled-El-Abbes
 Douar Menkoura (Ouled-Ali)
 Douar Ouled-Deflten
 Douar Adjama
 Douar Meknassa
 Douar Chekala
 Aarch Ouled-Bakhta
 Aarch Matmata
 Aarch Halouia -Cherraga
 Aarch Halouia-Gheraba
 Âarch Keraich-Cherrag
 Âarch Keraich-Gheraba
 Aarch Ouled-Berkane
 Aarch Maacem

References

 
Berber peoples and tribes